Charadra patafex is a moth of the family Noctuidae. It is known only from Guerrero Mill in the State of Hidalgo in Mexico, where it was found at 9000 feet elevation.

It is possibly associated with dry oak woodlands at higher elevations.

External links
The North American species of Charadra Walker, with a revision of the Charadra pata (Druce) group (Noctuidae, Pantheinae)

Pantheinae
Moths described in 1916